Muurinen is a Finnish surname. Notable people with the surname include:

 Antti Muurinen (born 1954), Finnish football coach
 Kimmo Muurinen (born 1981), Finnish basketball player

Finnish-language surnames